Klein Bonaire (Dutch for "Little Bonaire") is a small uninhabited islet off the west coast of the Caribbean island of Bonaire, and is part of the Dutch special municipality of Bonaire.

Geography 
The only structures on the island are some ruins of slave huts (small, single-room structures dating to the region's period of slavery), and a small open shelter on the beach facing Bonaire. The island has no running water or sanitation facilities.

History 
In 1868, Klein Bonaire was sold to Angel Jeserun and remained in private hands until 1999.  During this period the native trees were removed, resulting in a scrub growth across the island. The development of Klein Bonaire was attempted a few times prior to its establishment as a marine preserve, the last unsuccessful attempt being in 1995.

Concerned locals rallied to save Klein Bonaire and raise funds to do so and The Foundation for the Preservation of Klein Bonaire (FPKB) was born. Through efforts of the FPKB and other concerned parties, and with monies from the Department of the Interior and Kingdom Affairs of the Netherlands, the World Nature Fund of the Netherlands and FPKB, the island was successfully purchased in 1999 for 9 million Netherlands Antillean guilder (US$5 million). 

Klein Bonaire is now part of the Bonaire National Marine Park.  Long-term plans include reintroduction of the native vegetation.

Flora and Fauna 
Klein Bonaire is permanently home to green (Chelonia mydas) and hawksbill sea turtles (Eretmochelys imbricata).
During the nesting season it is also home to loggerhead sea turtles (Caretta caretta) and occasional flamingos.

Montastraea annularis was the most common coral seen during a recent 2011 survey.

Birds
Klein Bonaire has been identified by BirdLife International as an Important Bird Area (IBA) because it supports populations of threatened or restricted-range bird species, including bare-eyed pigeons, least terns and Caribbean elaenias. It is also a breeding site for Wilson's and snowy plovers.

Tourism 
This span is frequently traversed by private and commercial boats and can be done by kayak with some difficulty. The primary attraction for visitors is scuba diving and snorkeling the pristine coral reef surrounding the islet. Numbered yellow painted rocks near the open shelter show where divers can cross low points on the reef, which is very close to the beach. When facing the water at the rocks the current runs from right to left.

Gallery

See also 
 Bonaire National Marine Park

References

External links
Klein Bonaire photos

Landforms of Bonaire
Islands of the Netherlands Antilles
Uninhabited islands of the Netherlands
Ramsar sites in the Netherlands
Important Bird Areas of the Dutch Caribbean
Birds of Bonaire